Dioptis pellucida is a moth of the family Notodontidae first described by William Warren in 1901. It is found in Colombia.

There is a brown hindwing form, which belongs to a mimicry complex with several Ithomiini species, including Hypoleria lavinia, Ithomia diasia, Oleria amalda and Pseudoscada timna.

References

Moths described in 1901
Notodontidae of South America